Palakollu railway station (station code:PKO), is located in Palakollu of West Godavari district in the state of Andhra Pradesh. It belongs to South Coast Railway zone under Vijayawada railway division.

History 
GDV-NSP Broad gauge railway opened by Jagjivan Ram Railway Minister on 8 October 1961.

Classification 
Palakollu Railway station In terms of earnings and outward passengers handled, Palakollu Railway station is categorized as a Non-Suburban Grade-5 (NSG-5) railway station. Based on the re–categorization of Indian Railway stations for the period of 2017–18 and 2022–23, an NSG–5 category station earns between – crore and handles  passengers.

Station amenities 

It is one of the 38 stations in the division to be equipped with Automatic Ticket Vending Machines (ATVMs).

References

External links 
 
 Palakollu City
 Railway website

Railway stations in Andhra Pradesh
Vijayawada railway division
Railway stations in Vijayawada railway division
Railway stations in West Godavari district
Palakollu
Railway stations opened in 1916
Railway stations on Bhimavaram-Narasapur branch line
Transport in Palakollu
Buildings and structures in Palakollu